The 2005–06 KNVB Cup was the 88th edition of the premier knockout tournament in the Netherlands. The tournament started on 2 August 2005 and the final was held on 7 May 2006. Ajax beat PSV 2–1 in the final, winning the trophy for the sixteenth time.

Teams
 All 18 participants of the Eredivisie 2005-06
 All 20 participants of the Eerste Divisie 2005-06
 47 teams from lower (amateur) leagues
 Two youth teams

Qualifying round

First round 

E Eredivisie; 1 Eerste Divisie; A Amateur teams

Second round

Third round

Last 16 
Six Eredivisie teams entered the tournament this round. They had previously been playing in the Champions League and UEFA Cup.

E six Eredivisie entrants

Quarter finals

Semi-finals

Final

Both Ajax and PSV already secured a Champions League spot in the national competition. Therefore, the UEFA Cup ticket the winner of this tournament would win, could now be won in the Eredivisie play-offs.

See also
Eredivisie 2005-06
Eerste Divisie 2005-06

References

External links
 Results by Ronald Zwiers 

2005-06
2005–06 domestic association football cups
2005–06 in Dutch football